The Pinacoteca del Castello Sforzesco is an art gallery in the museum complex of the Castello Sforzesco in Milan, northern Italy.

History
Inaugurated in 1878, the gallery displays over 230 artworks, which include masterpieces by Titian, Andrea Mantegna, Canaletto, Antonello da Messina, Pisanello, Vincenzo Foppa, Giovanni Bellini, Correggio, Bernardino Luini, Lorenzo Lotto, Tintoretto and others. The complete collection of the museum, enriched in the last two centuries by donations of illustrious citizens and collectors, now has more than 1,500 artworks.

The first rooms of the Pinacoteca are dedicated to religious paintings of the 15th and 16th centuries, with artworks by Vincenzo Foppa, Bergognone, Bramantino, Carlo Crivelli, Bernardino Luini and other Lombard and Italian Renaissance painters. This part of the museum includes the Trivulzio Madonna by Andrea Mantegna, dating from 1497. (Another Trivulzio Madonna by Filippo Lippi is also in the museum.)

The second half of the Pinacoteca displays artworks from the 16th, 17th and 18th centuries. This includes both secular and religious works from artists such as Canaletto, Giambattista Tiepolo, Bernardo Bellotto, Titian and Tintoretto.

Some portraits of members of the Sforza family from the 15th to 16th centuries are also on display in the museum.

See also
Castello Sforzesco

Gallery

Sources
.
Various authors, Milano e provincia, Touring Club Italiano ed. 2003

External links
 
 

Art museums and galleries in Milan
1878 establishments in Italy
Museums established in 1878
Sforza Castle
Tourist attractions in Milan